Macroplea japana is a species of beetle from the family of leaf beetles of the subfamily Donaciinae. Beetle is up to 6 mm. in length. It was previously considered to be a subspecies of Macroplea mutica.

Distribution
The beetle can be found in Asian countries like Japan, and Primorsky krai of Russia. It considered to be a native species of Asia, Australia, Europe, and North America. In North America it is considered to be an invasive species since the 1950s.

References

Beetles described in 1885
Donaciinae
Beetles of Asia